Mammoth Spring is a city in Fulton County, Arkansas. The population was 929 at the time of the 2020 census and is home to Mammoth Spring, one of the largest natural springs in the world, renowned for its trout fishing.

History
In 1890, Mammoth Spring was promoted to Memphis investors as an excellent site for construction of major manufacturing operations. At that time the town was home to an upscale resort hotel, The Nettleton, said to rival those in Eureka Springs, Ark.. The Nettleton was built by Memphis millionaire Napoleon Hill and operated from 1899 to 1932, when it was destroyed by fire.

Geography

Demographics

2020 census

As of the 2020 United States census, there were 929 people, 468 households, and 286 families residing in the city.

2010 census
At the 2010 census there were 977 people in 460 households, including 350 families, in the city. The racial makeup of the city was 96.4% White, 0.9% Black or African American, 0.5% Native American, 0.4% Asian, and 0.2% from two or more races. The percentage of the population of Hispanic or Latino of any race was 0.6%.
Of the 509 households 28.1% had children under the age of 18 living with them, 55.6% were married couples living together, 11.2% had a female householder with no husband present, and 31.2% were non-families. 29.3% of households were one person and 17.1% were one person aged 65 or older. The average household size was 2.25 and the average family size was 2.75.

The age distribution was 23.6% under the age of 18, 5.2% from 18 to 24, 23.4% from 25 to 44, 25.6% from 45 to 64, and 22.1% 65 or older. The median age was 43 years. For every 100 females, there were 85.3 males. For every 100 females age 18 and over, there were 82.1 males.

The median household income was $20,588 and the median family income was $26,438. Males had a median income of $18,750 versus $16,328 for females. The per capita income for the city was $12,487. About 13.6% of families and 19.3% of the population were below the poverty line, including 24.3% of those under age 18 and 16.4% of those age 65 or over.

Climate
The climate in this area is characterized by hot, humid summers and generally mild-to-cool winters. According to the Köppen Climate Classification system, Mammoth Spring has a humid subtropical climate, abbreviated "Cfa" on climate maps.

Grand Ole Opry connection
Mammoth Spring is credited with providing the original inspiration to George D. Hay to create what became the Grand Ole Opry in Nashville.  Hay was sent on a reporting assignment to Mammoth Spring in 1919 when he was invited to a hoedown in a local cabin.  There, a fiddle player, a guitar player, and a banjo player performed until dawn.  Hay was impressed, and that planted the seed for his later efforts.

Notable people 
 Tess Harper, actress
 James Robinson Risner, United States Air Force brigadier general
 Ashley McBryde, country music singer-songwriter

References

External links
 Mammoth Spring Chamber of Commerce
 Local Weather

Cities in Fulton County, Arkansas
Cities in Arkansas